ჶ, Ჶ (ჶი) —  Old letter of Georgian scripts. Now obsolete in Georgian. It was used in the 20th century in words which came from other languages such as: ჶილმი (ფილმი-Film) etc.

Today the letter is used in the  Laz language.

Codes

References 

 Graphemica (ჶ)

Georgian letters